Franz Krumm (16 October 1909 – 9 March 1943) was a German footballer who played as a forward.

On 12 June 1932, Krumm scored one of the goals in the 2–0 victory over Eintracht Frankfurt (the other goalscorer being Oskar Rohr) in the Städtisches Stadion in Nuremberg, helping Bayern Munich win the German football championship.

Krumm played two games for the Germany national team between 1932 and 1933, for which he scored one goal.

Krumm was killed in action on the Eastern Front of World War II in Russia.

References

External links
 
 

1909 births
1943 deaths
German footballers
Association football forwards
Germany international footballers
FC Bayern Munich footballers
German military personnel killed in World War II